Lake–Evesham Historic District is a national historic district in Baltimore, Maryland, United States. It incorporates 260 buildings representing its development over the period 1870–1946. The majority of buildings in the district are bungalows and houses in various revival styles built in the 1920s and 1930s, when Lake Evesham was actively developed as a residential suburb.

It was added to the National Register of Historic Places in 2003.

References

External links

, including photo dated 2002, at Maryland Historical Trust
Boundary Map of the Lake Evesham Historic District, Baltimore City, at Maryland Historical Trust
Lake Evesham Community Association (LECA) website

Historic districts on the National Register of Historic Places in Baltimore
Victorian architecture in Maryland